Mutta (Hindi: वतु, Urdu: مٹا) is a Punjabi tribe in India and Pakistan. It is a  Brahmin subclan  from the Sindhu. Wattu are also found among Jat gotra (clan). The Mutta are found among Hindus as well as Muslims. The Muslim Mutta live in Punjab, Pakistan. They are Hindus and Sikhs in India while Muslims in Pakistan.

Social groups of Pakistan
Muslim communities of India
Punjabi tribes